The 1977 Rothmans 500 was an endurance race for Group C Touring Cars. The event was staged at the Oran Park Raceway in New South Wales on 12 June 1977 over 222 laps of the "Grand Prix" circuit, totalling 582 km. Competing cars were divided into the following three classes based on engine capacity:
Class A: Over 3000 cc
Class B: 2001–3000 cc
Class C: Up to 2000 cc

This was the first of two "Rothmans 500" events held at Oran Park, the second and final race being the 1978 Rothmans 500.

Results

References

A History of Australian Motor Sport, 1980
Holden, The Official Racing History, 1989
Racing Car News, July 1977
Racing Car News, July 1987
The History of the Falcon GT, by Stewart Wilson
The Sydney Morning Herald, Monday, 13 June 1977

Rothmans 500